Orange Warsaw Festival is a Polish annual music festival. The first edition took place in 2008. Since 2010 it has been broadcast on television by TVN. It moved to the National Stadium in May 2013. The 2014 edition took place on 13–15 June 2014 at the National Stadium with headliners Kings of Leon and Queens of the Stone Age (both Friday 13th), Florence and the Machine (Saturday 14th), and David Guetta and Kasabian (both Sunday 15th). Since 2015, the festival takes place at Służewiec Racing Track.

Artists

2022 
Friday, 3 June: 
Orange Stage: Tyler, The Creator, Nas, Charli XCX, Joey Bada$$
Warsaw Stage: Żabson x Young Igi, Szczyl, Kinny Zimmer, Julia Wieniawa, Zalia

Saturday, 4 June: 
Orange Stage: Florence + The Machine, Stormzy, Foals, Rosalie. 
Warsaw Stage: Sigrid, Earl Sweatshirt, Kacperczyk, Kukon, Kasia Lins

2021 
The 2021 edition of the festival supposed to be held on Friday, June 4 and Saturday June 5. Tyler, The Creator, Young Thug and Brockhapmton were set to perform, however the festival was cancelled due to the COVID-19 pandemic.

2020 
The 2020 edition of the festival was cancelled due to the COVID-19 pandemic. The following are the original dates and headliners:

Friday 5 June: Camila Cabello, 5 Seconds of Summer, Tyler, the Creator, Young Thug

Saturday 6 June: Brockhampton

2019 
Friday 31 May:
Orange Stage: Marshmello, Solange Knowles, Rita Ora, Quebonafide
Warsaw Stage: Otsochodzi, Bitamina, SG Lewis, Łona i Webber + The Pimps

Saturday 1 June:
Orange Stage: Miley Cyrus, Troye Sivan, The Raconteurs, Miles Kane
Warsaw Stage: Julia Pietrucha, Jan-rapowanie, Terrific Sunday, Lor, MIN t

2018 
Friday 1 June:
Orange Stage: Sam Smith, LCD Soundsystem, Dua Lipa, O.S.T.R.
Warsaw Stage: Rasmentalism, Ralph Kaminski, Nines, Sonar, Rebeka

Saturday 2 June:
Orange Stage: Florence + The Machine, Tyler, the Creator, Axwell Λ Ingrosso, Taco Hemingway
Warsaw Stage: Mela Koteluk, The Dumplings, Mery Spolsky, Marcelina, Baranovski

2017 
Friday 2 June:
Orange Stage: Kodaline, Years & Years, Kings Of Leon, Martin Garrix
Warsaw Stage: Suumoo, Little Simz, Łona i Webber, Maria Peszek, Kamp!

Saturday 3 June: 
Orange Stage: Daria Zawiałow, Two Door Cinema Club, Imagine Dragons, Justice
Warsaw Stage: Rosalie, Lor, Miuosh, You Me At Six, Natalia Nykiel

2016 
Friday 3 June:
Orange Stage: Marcelina, Skunk Anansie, Lana Del Rey, Die Antwoord
Warsaw Stage: Sorry Boys, Xxanaxx, Blossoms, Kaliber 44

Saturday 4 June:
Orange Stage: Tom Odell, MØ, Editors, Schoolboy Q, Skrillex
Warsaw Stage: Bovska, Julia Marcell, Ten Typ Mes, Natalia Przybysz, Daughter

2015 
Friday 12 June:
Orange Stage: Wolf Alice, Twin Atlantic, Crystal Fighters, Hey, Noel Gallagher's High Flying Birds, The Chemical Brothers
Warsaw Stage: Sheppard, Mela Koteluk, Afromental, Three Days Grace, Papa Roach
Rochstar Crew Tent: Terrific Sunday, Agyness B Marry, We Draw A, Kari, Gooral

Saturday 13 June:
Orange Stage: RusT, Palma Violets, Łąki Łan, Paloma Faith, Big Sean, Mark Ronson
Warsaw Stage: Bibobit, Kamp!, Organek, Nosowska, FKA Twigs
Rochstar Crew Tent: Rusty Cage, Young Stadium Club (Mizumono feat. Funk Rockass), Coria, Carrion, Baasch, Molesta Ewenement

Sunday 14 June:
Orange Stage: Birth of Joy, Benjamin Clementine, Metronomy, Bastille, Incubus, Muse
Warsaw Stage: Kadebostany, Bokka, Maria Peszek, Asking Alexandria, Parkway Drive
Rochstar Crew Tent: Zagi, K Bleax (Mizumono feat. Funk Rockass), Lari Lu, Cosovel

2014
Friday 13 June:
Orange Stage: French Films, Pixies, Queens of the Stone Age, Kings of Leon
Warsaw Stage: The Pretty Reckless, Jamal, Ska-P, Lily Allen, Snoop Dogg, Martin Garrix
Rochstar Crew Tent: Fair Weather Friends

Saturday 14 June:
Orange Stage: Bombay Bicycle Club, The Wombats, The Kooks, Florence + The Machine
Warsaw Stage: Ella Eyre, Skubas, Rita Ora, Hurts, The Prodigy, Chase & Status DJ Set
Rochstar Crew Tent: Organek

Sunday 15 June:
Orange Stage: Miles Kane, The 1975, Kasabian, Outkast, David Guetta
Warsaw Stage: Chemia, I Am Giant, Bring me the Horizon, Jurassic 5, Limp Bizkit
Rochstar Crew Tent: Xxanaxx

2013
Saturday 25 May: OCN, Tinie Tempah, Basement Jaxx, Beyoncé

Sunday 26 May: Lipali, Cypress Hill, The Offspring, Fatboy Slim

2012
Saturday 9 June: Fisz Emade Tworzywo, De La Soul, Garbage, Linkin Park

Sunday 10 June: Clock Machine, Power of Trinity, Kamp!, Ms Lauryn Hill, The Prodigy, Groove Armada DJ Set

2011
Saturday 17 June: Piotr Lisiecki, FOX, Michał Szpak, My Chemical Romance, Skunk Anansie, Moby

Sunday 17 June: Sistars, Plan B, The Streets, Jamiroquai

2010
Saturday 28 August: Kumka Olik, Kim Nowak, White Lies, Courtney Love & Hole, Edyta Bartosiewicz

Sunday 29 August: Aura Dione, Lisa Hannigan, Monika Brodka, Mika, Agnieszka Chylińska, Nelly Furtado

2009
Friday 4 September:
Main Stage: Maria Sadowska, Ja Confetti, Smolik Project Big Band, Razorlight

Saturday 5 September:
Main Stage: Afromental, June, The Crystal Method, N.E.R.D., Groove Armada Live
Young Stage: Orange Passion, Out of Tune, Skinny Patrini, Plastic, Calvin Harris, MGMT

2008
Saturday 6 September: 
Stage A: Apollo 440, Wyclef Jean, Kelly Rowland, a tribute to Tadeusz Nalepa (Jan Borysewicz, Maciej Silski, Piotr Nalepa, Piotr Cugowski)
Stage B: Teddybears, Cafe Fogg, Rita

Notes

References

Music festivals in Poland